R394 road may refer to:
 R394 road (Ireland)
 R394 road (South Africa)